The Ven. Brian Watson Woodhams (16 January 1911 - 25 August 1992) was a British Anglican priest, most notably Archdeacon of Newark from 1965 to 1979.

Woodhams was educated at Dover College, Oak Hill Theological College and St John's College, Durham, where he graduated with a Bachelor of Arts in 1936. He was ordained Deacon in 1936; and Priest in 1937. He served curacies in Holloway, Bethnal Green and New Malden; and incumbencies at Poplar, Mapperley and  Farndon.

References

1911 births
1992 deaths
Alumni of Oak Hill College
Archdeacons of Newark
People educated at Dover College
Alumni of St John's College, Durham